Tioga Lake is a small lake in the South Orkney Islands. It lies north-northeast of Port Jebsen and northwest of Tioga Hill, from which it takes its name, on Signy Island. Named by the United Kingdom Antarctic Place-Names Committee (UK-APC) in 1981.

Lakes of the South Orkney Islands
Geography of the British Antarctic Territory